Naft Tehran Football Club (Bashgah-e Futbal-e Nuft Teheran) is an Iranian football club based in Tehran, Iran. They competed in the Persian Gulf Pro League. They were owned by the National Iranian Oil Company previously. Naft Tehran was founded in 1950 and played in the Takhti Stadium until 2018.

Naft has finished third place in the Persian Gulf Pro League three times and has also won the Hazfi Cup. In 2015, for the first time in the club's history, Naft played in the AFC Champions League. They defeated Al-Ahli of Saudi Arabia in the round of 16 to advance to the quarter–finals where they were eliminated by Al-Ahli Dubai.

Following the departures of their best players, Naft Tehran were relegated to the second tier in 2017.

While the club was dealing with ownership and financial problems, forfeiting two matches in the second tier resulted in their relegation to the 3rd tier of Iranian Football. On October 22, 2018, the minister of sports announced the club's dissolution. Subsequently, players and the staff were released. Since then, Naft Tehran is participating as Naft Iranian Tehran in League 3.

History

Establishment
On 23 August 1971, National Iranian Oil Company decided on starting a football team. Before the Iranian Revolution the team competed in the Tehran Football League for several years. In 2003, the club was competing in the Tehran Local Leagues. In 2005, they were promoted to the 3rd Division.

Naft Tehran was competing in Iran's 2nd Division and they turned out to be one of the best teams. In the first round, they had managed to score 36 goals and convecting only 14, they were on top of Iranjavan with 38 points. In the second round, they came out second at the Group B. They were just under Mes Sarcheshmeh with 3 points away and 1 point on top of Esteghlal Jonub Tehran, Naft Tehran after promoted to Azadegan League.

Promotion to Iran Pro League
After three years of competing in the 2nd Division, Naft was promoted to the Azadegan League. Naft Tehran started the season well in Azadegan League and eventually became first in the group tables. Naft Tehran came out with a huge goal difference by conceding the fewest goals, and they were on top of the table by 1 point from Damash Gilan They didn't score much as their top scorer Akbar Saghiri scored 7 goals in the league. It was the first time ever that Naft Tehran went to Iran Pro League.

Iran Pro League

Naft Tehran was competing in Iran's 2nd Division and they turned out to be one of the best teams. In the First Round they had managed to score 36 goals and conceding only 14, they were on top of Iranjavan with 38 points. In the Second Round they came out second at the Group B. They were just under Mes Sarcheshmeh with 3 points away and 1 point on top of Esteghlal Jonub Tehran, Naft Tehran after promoted to Azadegan League.

Naft Tehran started the season well in Azadegan League and eventually became first in the group tables. Naft Tehran came out with a huge goal difference by conceding the fewest goals, and they were on top of the table by one point from Damash Gilan. They didn't score much as their top scorer Akbar Saghiri scored seven goals in the league. It was the first time ever that Naft Tehran went to Persian Gulf Pro League.

Champions League
On the final day of the 2013–14 Iran Pro League season, Naft lead the league and had an opportunity to win the league. However, Naft lost to Sepahan and dropped to 3rd place, which was still good enough for a spot in the AFC Champions League, the first time in club history the team has reached the international stage. In May 2014 Yahya Golmohammadi announced that he would not be extending his contract with Naft and had signed with Zob Ahan. Shortly after on 31 May, Naft revealed Ali Reza Mansourian as their manager for the 2014–15 season. The club qualified for the 2015 AFC Champions League group stage after a 1–0 win over Qatari club El Jaish in the play-off round. Naft won its first ever Champions League game in a 2–1 victory against Saudi club Al Shabab. On 6 May 2015 the club advanced to the round of 16 of the AFC Champions League.

On 15 May 2015, on the final matchday of the league, Naft went in to the final match second and tied on points with Tractor, whom they played in the final match. Naft drew with Tractor 3–3 and finished third in the league, securing a Champions League play-off spot. In the Hazfi Cup final, Naft Tehran was defeated by Zob Ahan.

Hazfi Cup champions
During the 2015–16 season, Naft encountered severe financial issues and could not pay the players and coaching staff. The National Iranian Oil Company decided to sell the club and it was believed that relegated Malavan would buy the clubs rights and remain in the Persian Gulf Pro League. However, Behnam Pishro Company bought Naft and the team remained in Tehran.

After Alireza Mansourian left the club to become head coach of Esteghlal, the club hired Iranian legend Ali Daei to lead the club. After Daei took over the team in 2016, financial issues in the club continued. Despite this Naft was fighting for an AFC Champions League spot for most of the season. Naft also had success in the Hazfi Cup, Daei's team defeated Sepahan 1–0 to advance to the final against Tractor. In the final Sajjad Shahbazzadeh scored a late winner for Naft as the club won its first major domestic title.

Relegation to 3rd Division and dissolution
After Disturbance in the Club Regarding Ownership Issue, it was declared that Naft Tehran Relegated to 3rd Division and 2018–19 Azadegan League will resume with remaining 17 teams.

Supporters
Before Naft's successful season in the AFC Champions League, the club had only a few supporters who were mostly workers of the National Iranian Oil Company. In 2015 after a third-place finish in the league, reaching the final of the Hazfi Cup and advancing to the quarter-finals of the Champions League the club gained some supporters and became the third most popular team in Tehran behind Persepolis and Esteghlal.

Relegation to 3rd Division 
After the Disturbance in the Club Regarding Ownership Issue, it was declared that Naft Tehran Relegated to 3rd Division and 2018–19 Azadegan League will resume with remaining 17 teams.

Season-by-season
The table below comes from List of Naft Tehran F.C. seasons

The table below chronicles the achievements of Naft Tehran in various competitions since 2003.

Individual records
Lists of the players with the most caps and top goalscorers for the club, as of 13 March 2016 (players in bold signifies current Naft Tehran player). (The stats are from 2009)

Top scorers

Top scorers by season

Clean sheets by season

AFC Champions League record

AFC record

Top goalscorers in AFC Champions League

Honours

Domestic
Persian Gulf Pro League
Third place (2): 2013–14, 2014–15
Hazfi Cup
Winners (1): 2016–17
Runners-up (1): 2014–15
Iranian Super Cup
Runners-up (1): 2017
Azadegan League
Champions (1): 2009–10
2nd Division
Champions (1): 2008–09
3rd Division
Champions (1): 2005–06
Tehran Province League
Champions (1): 2004–05

Invitational
Afghanistan Republic Day Cup
Runners-up (1): 1974

References

External links

Official Website

Football clubs in Tehran
Association football clubs established in 1950
1950 establishments in Iran